Aitor Karanka de la Hoz (Basque and ; born 18 September 1973) is a Spanish football manager and former player who is currently the head coach of Maccabi Tel Aviv.

Save for a brief spell in the United States at age 32, Karanka played solely in Spain for Athletic Bilbao and Real Madrid, appearing in 275 La Liga matches over 13 seasons and winning six honours with the latter.

Karanka started his managerial career in the late 2000s, working as assistant manager at Real Madrid during José Mourinho's tenure as manager from 2010 to 2013. He was appointed manager of EFL Championship club Middlesbrough in 2013, guiding them to promotion to the Premier League in 2016 before being dismissed the following year. He became Nottingham Forest manager in January 2018, leaving the role just over a year later in 2019. He was appointed as head coach of another Championship club, Birmingham City, in July 2020 and stepped down in March 2021.

Playing career

Club

Athletic / Real Madrid
Born in Vitoria-Gasteiz, Álava, Karanka played as a youth with hometown club Deportivo Alavés and finished his formation with Basque neighbours Athletic Bilbao. He made his senior debut with the reserves of the latter in 1992, competing in the Segunda División.

Karanka was promoted to the main squad by Jupp Heynckes in 1993 following the departure of Rafael Alkorta. He made his La Liga debut on 7 November in a 1–1 away draw against Celta de Vigo (90 minutes played), going on to feature in exactly 100 league matches in his three full seasons before joining the German coach at Real Madrid in 1997 (replacing Alkorta, who had just rejoined Athletic Bilbao).

Karanka was used mostly as a backup with the capital-based team but appeared in 33 UEFA Champions League matches for them, including the final of the 1999–2000 edition against Valencia CF (3–0 win). He missed the vast majority of the 1998–99 campaign due to a heart condition.

Athletic return / United States

For 2002–03, Karanka returned to Athletic Bilbao on a three-year contract with a €40 million buyout clause. He helped the Lions qualify for the UEFA Cup in his second year after finishing in fifth place in the league.

In 2006, Karanka joined Major League Soccer (MLS) club Colorado Rapids in the United States. In his only season in MLS, he helped Colorado to the Western Conference play-off final, despite having his attempt saved by Darío Sala in the penalty shootout victory over FC Dallas in the semi-finals.

International
Karanka only played once for Spain at senior level, on 26 April 1995 against Armenia in Yerevan (2–0 win) for the UEFA Euro 1996 qualifiers. He made 14 appearances for the under-21s and was a member of the team that finished runners-up at the 1996 European Championship in a final lost to Italy.

Karanka also represented the nation in the 1996 Summer Olympics in Atlanta, playing in four matches in an eventual quarter-final exit.

Coaching career
Karanka's first role in management was with the Spanish under-16s national team.

In June 2010, Karanka was appointed assistant manager at former side Real Madrid by newly appointed manager José Mourinho. Three years later, he left the club following the arrival of Carlo Ancelotti, who brought his own coaching staff.

Middlesbrough
On 13 November 2013, Karanka was appointed manager of Championship club Middlesbrough, replacing Tony Mowbray. His first match in charge ended in a 1–2 away defeat against Leeds United, ten days later.

On 25 April 2015, in the club's penultimate game of the season away to Fulham, Karanka sent goalkeeper Dimitrios Konstantopoulos forward for an added-time corner kick with the score 3–3. With the goalkeeper out of position, the opponents scored a winner through Ross McCormack, which sent Watford into the Premier League and jeopardised Middlesbrough's own chances of promotion. He did qualify his team to the play-off final after a 5–1 aggregate win over Brentford, but they lost the decisive match 0–2 to Norwich City at Wembley Stadium.

On 7 August 2015, Karanka signed a new four-year contract. Boro were consistently in high positions during the campaign, but on 11 March 2016 he unexpectedly left the training ground after an argument and considered his future at the club. Responsibilities for the subsequent match, at Charlton Athletic, were handed to his assistant Steve Agnew, but the Spaniard returned to lead the team to the top division after a seven-year absence, as league runners-up.

In 2016–17, Karanka led Middlesbrough to the last eight of the FA Cup, where they were eliminated by Manchester City. He was sacked on 16 March 2017 with the team three points from top-flight safety and without a league win in the new year (while their defence was the fifth best in the division, their attack was the worst with just 19 goals from 27 matches, and he had disagreements with players, fans and the board). Club and manager parted ways by mutual consent, as the latter believed he could take the team no further.

Nottingham Forest
On 8 January 2018, Karanka returned to the Championship after being appointed as manager of Nottingham Forest. He replaced Gary Brazil, who had been acting as caretaker manager following the dismissal of Mark Warburton on 31 December 2017, who had in turn left the side sitting 14th in the league. His first match in charge saw Forest suffer a 1–0 defeat to Aston Villa, just days after his appointment. Karanka met his former club Middlesbrough for the first time on 7 April, where Forest were defeated 2–0.

During his first summer transfer window in charge, prior to his first full season as manager, Forest signed João Carvalho from Benfica for £13.2 million, the club's most expensive transfer acquisition. Forest began the season very well, which originally saw them establish a five-match undefeated run. They continued their positive form up until December, where they only won one out of six matches during the final month of the year, which would ultimately cost Karanka his position. On 11 January 2019, he departed the City Ground after requesting to be released from his contract. He left the team in seventh position, four points behind the play-off places. A key reason behind Karanka's departure was the breakdown in relationship between him and Forest's Chief Executive, Ioannis Vrentzos. Forest's ambitious board were dissatisfied with Forest's play-off challenge and felt that the club should have been challenging for the automatic promotion places.

Birmingham City
On 31 July 2020, after 18 months away from management, Karanka was appointed head coach of EFL Championship club Birmingham City on a three-year contract. On 16 March 2021, the club confirmed that he had stepped down from his role after a run of just three wins in 19 matches left the team just outside the relegation zone.  Former Charlton Athletic manager Lee Bowyer was announced as his successor shortly afterwards.

AK Coaches' World
In May 2021, Karanka organised an online coaching conference in association with the Royal Spanish Football Federation, under the name AK Coaches' World. The event focused on women's football, and participants included Ronaldo Nazário, Julen Lopetegui, Monchi, Iraia Iturregi, Jorge Vilda and Mila Martínez.

Granada
Following a 4–1 defeat at home to Levante on 17 April 2022, Granada dismissed interim head coach Rubén Torrecilla and appointed Karanka as his replacement, tasked with using the remaining six matches to avoid relegation from La Liga. He made his debut on 20 April, securing a goalless draw at reigning champions Atlético Madrid, and won two of the remaining fixtures, but a final-day draw against Espanyol was not enough to secure safety.

Karanka was confirmed as the club's head coach for the coming season, but was sacked on 8 November 2022, after one win in five matches.

Personal life
Karanka's younger brother, David, is also a former footballer. A striker, he also appeared for Athletic Bilbao's first team but with much less impact, going on to spend the vast majority of his professional career in the second level or the lower leagues.

Career statistics

Club

International

Managerial

Honours

Player
Real Madrid
La Liga: 2000–01
Supercopa de España: 1997, 2001
UEFA Champions League: 1997–98, 1999–2000, 2001–02

Spain U21
UEFA European Under-21 Championship runner-up: 1996; third place: 1994

Manager
Middlesbrough
Football League Championship runner-up (promotion): 2015–16

Individual
Football League Championship Manager of the Month: January 2015, September 2015, December 2015

References

External links

1973 births
Living people
Footballers from Vitoria-Gasteiz
Spanish footballers
Association football defenders
La Liga players
Segunda División players
Deportivo Alavés players
Bilbao Athletic footballers
Athletic Bilbao footballers
Real Madrid CF players
Major League Soccer players
Colorado Rapids players
UEFA Champions League winning players
Spain under-21 international footballers
Spain under-23 international footballers
Spain international footballers
Olympic footballers of Spain
Footballers at the 1996 Summer Olympics
Basque Country international footballers
Spanish expatriate footballers
Expatriate soccer players in the United States
Spanish expatriate sportspeople in the United States
Spanish football managers
Premier League managers
English Football League managers
La Liga managers
Israeli Premier League managers
Middlesbrough F.C. managers
Nottingham Forest F.C. managers
Birmingham City F.C. managers
Granada CF managers
Maccabi Tel Aviv F.C. managers
Spanish expatriate football managers
Expatriate football managers in England
Expatriate football managers in Israel
Spanish expatriate sportspeople in England
Spanish expatriate sportspeople in Israel